Knowing You is a 2005 album by jazz singer and swing jazz guitarist John Pizzarelli. The album is composed of primarily jazz and pop standards and received a very favorable review at AllMusic by music critic Matt Collar.

Track listing 
"Coffee, Black"
"New Sun in the Sky"
"Ain't That a Kick in the Head?"
"The Shadow of Your Smile"
"Pick Yourself Up"
"Knowing You"
"God Only Knows"
"Quality Time"
"Eastwood Lane"
"I Just Found Out About Love"
"Say It (Over and Over Again)"
"That Face"
"How Long Has This Been Going On?"
"The First Hint of Autumn"
"If It's the Last Thing I Do"

Personnel
John Pizzarellivocals, guitar
Ray Kennedypiano
Martin Pizzarellidouble-bass
Harry Allentenor saxophone
Jessica Molaskeyvocals
Larry Goldingspiano
Tony Tedescodrums

References

2005 albums
John Pizzarelli albums
Mainstream jazz albums
Vocal jazz albums